Introduction is an album by the experimental rock band Red Krayola, released in 2006 via Drag City.

Critical reception
The Austin Chronicle called the album a "highly eclectic glide through folk, blues, electronic, and post-punk." Magnet wrote: "With Introduction, Thompson and Co. take on Americana 21st-century style, pushing the oddities of past albums to the background while emphasizing melody and giving free range to Thompson’s warm-yet-eerie comments on shark attacks and unbroken circles." CMJ New Music Monthly called it "further proof that Thompson is one of the few geniuses demented enough to have never suffered growing pains."

Track listing

Personnel 
Red Krayola
John McEntire – drums, synthesizer, ukulele, mixing, recording
Stephen Prina – guitar, harpsichord, piano, organ, tambourine, vocals
Mayo Thompson – vocals, guitar
Tom Watson – bass guitar, guitar, harpsichord, synthesizer, vocals

Additional musicians and production
Charlie Abel – accordion
Drag City – production
Noel Kupersmith – bass guitar, photography
Dan Osborne – illustration
Roger Seibel – mastering
Chris Strong – photography

References

External links 
 

2006 albums
Drag City (record label) albums
Red Krayola albums